Earl of Holland was a title in the Peerage of England. It was created in 1624 for Henry Rich, 1st Baron Kensington. He was the younger son of Robert Rich, 1st Earl of Warwick, and had already been created Baron Kensington in 1623, also in the Peerage of England, having married Isabelle Cope, daughter and sole heiress of Sir Walter Cope (c.1553-1614), of Cope Castle in Kensington, Middlesex. His eldest son, the second Earl, succeeded his first cousin as fifth Earl of Warwick in 1673. All the titles became extinct on the death of the eighth Earl of Warwick and fifth Earl of Holland in 1759 (see Earl of Warwick for a more detailed description of the descent of the titles).

Lady Mary Rich, daughter of the first Earl of Holland, married Sir John Campbell, 5th Baronet, who was created Earl of Breadalbane and Holland in the Peerage of Scotland in 1681. Also, Lady Elizabeth Rich, only daughter and heiress of the fifth Earl of Warwick and second Earl of Holland, married Francis Edwardes. Their son William Edwardes succeeded to parts of the Rich estates and was created Baron Kensington in the Peerage of Ireland in 1776.

The name "Holland" in the title refers to the area of Lincolnshire historically known as Holland.

Earls of Holland (1624)
 Henry Rich, 1st Earl of Holland (1590–1649)
Robert Rich, 2nd Earl of Holland, 5th Earl of Warwick (c. 1620–1675)
Henry Rich, Lord Kensington (1642–1659)
Edward Rich, 3rd Earl of Holland, 6th Earl of Warwick (1673–1701)
Edward Henry Rich, 4th Earl of Holland, 7th Earl of Warwick (1697–1721)
Edward Rich, 5th Earl of Holland, 8th Earl of Warwick (1695–1759)

See also
Earl of Warwick (1618)
Earl of Breadalbane and Holland
Baron Kensington
Baron Holland

Notes

References
Kidd, Charles, Williamson, David (editors). Debrett's Peerage and Baronetage (1990 edition). New York: St Martin's Press, 1990, 

Extinct earldoms in the Peerage of England
Noble titles created in 1624
Holland